The Cape May was a Canadian musical act from Calgary, Alberta. The band's songs are centred on the poetic lyrics of vocalist Clinton St. John, which tell moody stories of urban dystopia and a culture on the brink.

History
The Cape May was formed in 2003 by Clinton St. John (vocals, guitars) and Jeff MacLeod (drums, guitars, keys, backing vocals). The band released their first album Central City May Rise Again on Flemish Eye in 2005; Jeff Deringer also contributed guitar to the album. The band embarked on a North American tour to support Central City May Rise Again after their record reached number 1 on the Canadian College music charts.

The band's lineup was later rounded out by multi-instrumentalist Matt Flegel. In 2006 they were invited by Nina Nastasia to be her backing band on tour across the US and Europe, opening on many of the dates. That year they released their second album, Glass Mountain Roads, with the help of engineer Steve Albini.

St John began to release his own music in 2007 and released his last album in 2014.
Clinton St. John and Jeff Macleod reunited in 2020 to form the band Florida BC and released their debut album Salt Breaker Sand with the help from local musicians Morgan Greenwood (of Azeda Booth and Baths) and Carl Davison (Hook and Eye). 
Matt Flegel went on to form the band Women and then Viet Cong; the name proved to be too controversial and is now called Preoccupations.

Discography
Central City May Rise Again (January 2005)
Glass Mountain Roads (September 2006)

See also

Music of Canada
Canadian rock
List of bands from Canada
List of Canadian musicians
:Category:Canadian musical groups

References

External links
Flemish Eye

Musical groups established in 2003
Canadian indie rock groups
Musical groups from Calgary
2003 establishments in Alberta